Bijak Tappeh (also Romanized as Bījak Tappeh; also known as Bīshak Tappeh) is a village in Osmanvand Rural District, Firuzabad District, Kermanshah County, Kermanshah Province, Iran. At the 2006 census, its population was 17, in 4 families.

References 

Populated places in Kermanshah County